Cass may refer to:

People and fictional characters
 Cass (surname), a list of people
 Cass (given name), a list of people and fictional characters
 Big Cass, ring name of wrestler William Morrissey
 Cass, in British band Skunk Anansie
 Cass, British singer, artist name of Brian Cassar
 Henri Cassini (1781–1832), French botanist, standard author abbreviation "Cass."
 Kevin Cassidy (born 1981), Gaelic footballer often referred to as "Cass"

Places

United States
 Cass, Indiana, an unincorporated community
 Cass, West Virginia, a census-designated place
 Cass Scenic Railroad State Park, in West Virginia
 Cass County (disambiguation)
 Bartow County, Georgia, formerly Cass County
 Cass Township (disambiguation)
 Fort Cass, in present-day Tennessee, 19th century US Army fortification

New Zealand
 Cass, New Zealand, a locality

Greenland
 Cass Fjord

Multiple countries
 Cass Lake (disambiguation)
 Cass River (disambiguation)

Schools
 Cass Business School, London
 Cass High School (disambiguation), several high schools
 Cass Technical High School, Detroit, Michigan

CASS
Chinese Academy of Social Sciences
Centre for Aerospace and Security Studies
Coding Accuracy Support System

Committee for the Advancement of Scientific Skepticism, a Canadian organization
Cargo Accounts Settlement Systems of the International Air Transport Association
CASS microscopy : Collective Accumulation of Single Scattering microscopy

Other uses
 Cass (1978 film), an Australian television film
 Cass (2008 film), a British crime drama
 Cass, a brand of beer from the South Korean company Oriental Brewery
 Cass identity model, theory of gay and lesbian identity development

See also

 
 
 Kass (disambiguation)
 CAS (disambiguation)